The Colorado River Headwaters National Scenic Byway is an  National Scenic Byway and Colorado Scenic and Historic Byway located in Eagle and Grand counties, Colorado, US. The byway follows the upper Colorado River from Grand Lake down to State Bridge. The byway connects with the Trail Ridge Road/Beaver Meadow National Scenic Byway at Grand Lake.

Route

Gallery

See also

History Colorado
List of scenic byways in Colorado
Scenic byways in the United States

Notes

References

External links

America's Byways
America's Scenic Byways: Colorado
Colorado Department of Transportation
Colorado Scenic & Historic Byways Commission
Colorado Scenic & Historic Byways
Colorado Travel Map
Colorado Tourism Office
History Colorado

Colorado Scenic and Historic Byways
National Scenic Byways
National Scenic Byways in Colorado
Arapaho National Forest
White River National Forest
Transportation in Colorado
Transportation in Eagle County, Colorado
Transportation in Grand County, Colorado
Tourist attractions in Colorado
Tourist attractions in Eagle County, Colorado
Tourist attractions in Grand County, Colorado
U.S. Route 34
U.S. Route 40